Gluggafoss is a waterfall in southern Iceland, specifically in the Fljótshlíð area. As the most prominent member of a series of waterfalls running from the river Merkjá , it is also known as Merkjárfoss ; both names are acknowledged on an on-site signpost.

The cliff supporting Gluggafoss has an upper palagonite (or tuff rock) portion and a lower basalt portion. Distinctive of Gluggafoss' geology are the holes and tunnels formed by the river through the soft palagonite. Known in Icelandic as gluggar, or 'windows', these holes allow observers at the base of the waterfall to see partly obscured water flow. According to the on-site signpost, the upper half of the waterfall could be seen only through three such vertically arranged holes prior to 1947. Since then, however, erosion has undone the blockages.

Small trails on the adjacent hills allow visitors to see both drops of the waterfall up close, and also to obtain a view from above. Seljalandsfoss is another waterfall nearby and of similar (or larger) size.

Gallery

See also

 Waterfalls of Iceland
 List of waterfalls

References

Waterfalls of Iceland